Saud Shakeel (born 5 September 1995) is a Pakistani cricketer. He made his international debut for the Pakistan cricket team in July 2021. He made his Test debut against England in December 2022. He was part of Pakistan's squad at the 2014 U-19 World Cup and has captained the team. He scored 127 runs in 6 innings that he played in the World Cup.

Career
He made his first-class debut on 26 October 2015 in the 2015–16 Quaid-e-Azam Trophy. In November 2017, he was selected to play for the Quetta Gladiators in 2018 Pakistan Super League players draft.

He was the leading run-scorer for Pakistan Television in the 2017–18 Quaid-e-Azam Trophy, with 488 runs in seven matches. In April 2018, he was named in Khyber Pakhtunkhwa's squad for the 2018 Pakistan Cup. He was the leading run-scorer for Pakistan Television in the 2018–19 Quaid-e-Azam Trophy, with 414 runs in five matches.

In December 2018, he was named in Pakistan's team for the 2018 ACC Emerging Teams Asia Cup. In March 2019, he was named in Federal Areas' squad for the 2019 Pakistan Cup. In September 2019, he was named in Sindh's squad for the 2019–20 Quaid-e-Azam Trophy tournament. In November 2019, he was named as the captain of Pakistan's squad for the 2019 ACC Emerging Teams Asia Cup in Bangladesh. In December 2020, he was shortlisted as one of the Domestic Cricketers of the Year for the 2020 PCB Awards.

In January 2021, he was named in Pakistan's Test squad for their series against South Africa. In March 2021, he was named in Pakistan's Test and limited overs squads for their tours to South Africa and Zimbabwe. However, he was ruled out of the One Day International (ODI) matches against South Africa due to an injury.

In June 2021, Shakeel was named in Pakistan's Test and ODI squads, for their tours of the West Indies and England respectively. Shakeel made his ODI debut on 8 July 2021, for Pakistan against England. In October 2021, he was named as the captain of the Pakistan Shaheens for their tour of Sri Lanka.

In November 2021, he was named in Pakistan's Test squad for their series against Bangladesh. In February 2022, he was also named in Pakistan's Test squad for their series against Australia. In June 2022, he was named in Pakistan's Test squad for their two-match series in Sri Lanka. 

In December 2022, he was selected to play for Pakistan in the Test series against New Zealand. In the second Test, on 4 January 2023, he hit his maiden century in Test cricket, which helped Pakistan to put 400+ runs in the board in reply to New Zealand's 449 in the first innings.

References

External links
 
 

1995 births
Living people
Pakistani cricketers
 Pakistan Test cricketers
Pakistan One Day International cricketers
Karachi Zebras cricketers
Cricketers from Karachi
Sindh cricketers
Quetta Gladiators cricketers
Pakistan Television cricketers